

Governmental bank

Landsbanki Føroya

Commercial banks

BankNordik  SWIFT: FIFBFOTX
Eik Banki  SWIFT: EIKBFOTF

Savings banks

Norðoya Sparikassi  SWIFT: NOYAFO21 (not connected)
Suðuroyar Sparikassi  SWIFT: SUSPFOT1 (not connected)

Faroe Islands
Banks
Faroe Islands